Shaun Payne (born 2 February 1972 in Cape Town, South Africa) is a South African-born, Irish-qualified retired rugby union player. He qualified to play for Ireland because his grandmother is from Easkey, County Sligo.

Munster
Payne made his debut for Munster in September 2003, against Leinster in a Celtic League game. He scored the first of his 18 tries for Munster against Cardiff Blues in November 2003.

His first silverware with Munster came in May 2005, when Munster beat Llanelli Scarlets 27-16 to win the 2004–2005 Celtic Cup.

He was Munster's fullback when they won their first Heineken Cup, beating Biarritz Olympique 19-23 in the 2006 Heineken Cup Final.

He retired at the end of the 2007–08 season, having been dropped from the Munster team during the knockout-stage of the 2007–08 Heineken Cup. His last appearance for Munster was against Ulster in a Celtic League game in April 2008.

International
Payne was called up to the senior Ireland squad for the 2005 Six Nations Championship.

Management
Payne became Munster Manager in the summer of 2007. He left this post in the summer of 2012 and returned to South Africa.

References

External links
Munster Player Profile
Munster Manager Profile

Living people
1972 births
South African rugby union players
Munster Rugby players
Rugby union fullbacks
Rugby union wings
Rugby union centres
South Africa international rugby sevens players
Sharks (Currie Cup) players
Sharks (rugby union) players